Bernhard I, Lord of Werle ( – ), was Lord of Werle from 1277 to 1281 and lord of Prisannewitz from 1281 until his death.  He was the son of Nicholas I of Werle and his wife, Jutta of Anhalt.  He was first mentioned in a document in 1273.

After his father's death in 1277 he initially ruled Werle jointly with his brothers Henry I and John I.  In 1281 it was decided to divide the principality and Bernhard took over control of the Prisannewitz section.  He was last mentioned as being alive on 9 March 1282; on 3 March 1288, he was mentioned as "deceased" by his nephew Nicholas II.  He probably died in 1286.  He was buried in the Doberan Minster.

No spouse or issue have been documented.

External links 
Genealogical table of the House of Mecklenburg

House of Mecklenburg
Lords of Werle
1240s births
1280s deaths
13th-century German nobility